Ai Maeda  may refer to:

Ai Maeda (voice actress) (born 1975),  Japanese voice actress featured in many anime series particularly Digimon
Ai Maeda (actress) (born 1983), Japanese film actress, including in Battle Royale, plus voice actor in anime series Kino's Journey